Tabuk Regional (Prince Sultan bin Abdulaziz ) Airport   is an international and public airport in Tabuk, Saudi Arabia. It was a former military airport until its renovation to become a public airport in 2011. Despite being an international airport, it only serves a few foreign destinations. There are plans to increase the number of international destinations to other neighboring countries. The airport has a single terminal building which uses air bridges for planes to disembark and load passengers. The airport was named after the late minister of Defence and crown prince Sultan bin Abdulaziz.

Military use
King Faisal Air Base (KFAB) shares the airport site and boundaries but uses a separate runway for operations. No. 2 Squadron RSAF flew the English Electric Lightning at Tabuk, up until at least 1985.

KFAB is home to the Royal Saudi Air Force Hawk training aircraft squadrons, as well as 88th Squadron -  'The Saudi Hawks'  aerobatic display team. KFAB also operates the F-15 Eagle aircraft at Tabuk.

Terminal

The airport has one terminal serving both international and domestic destinations. The airport has two levels, a ground level and an upper level. A royal terminal also exists next to the main airport building where heads of state and other high-ranking VIP visitors are received.

On the ground level, before security check and outside of the arrivals area, there are two coffee shops and a small gift shop. The shops open during flight operation hours. There are seven check-in/ticketing desks. After passengers go through check-in/ticketing, they proceed through security. Following security, they head to the upper level.

The upper level connects the departing and arriving passengers to the airplane via three air bridges. If an unoccupied air bridge is not available, passengers head to the ground level and onto a bus to take them to the waiting aircraft. The upper level also has a gift shop and a coffee shop, serving coffee and snacks. The upper level is divided into two sections, a domestic flights section and an international flights section, which are divided by the immigration officers desk.

Upon disembarkation, the passengers proceed downstairs, through immigration if they are on an international flight, to the baggage carousel, where they collect their baggage. The exit of the airport is also on the ground floor.

The Mosque
Next to the airport a mosque was built to accommodate for passengers and airport staff. The mosque is located to the right of the airport.

Airlines and destinations

Statistics

Accidents and incidents
On 11 July 1972, Douglas C-47B HZ-AAK of Saudia was damaged beyond economic repair in an accident at Tabuk Airport.

See also 

 Saudi Aviation Club
 Rabigh Wings Aviation Academy
 King Fahad International Airport

References

External links

Tabuk, Saudi Arabia
Airports in Saudi Arabia